Tobi 21 - Coptic Calendar - Tobi 23

The twenty-second day of the Coptic month of Tobi, the fifth month of the Coptic year. On a common year, this day corresponds to January 17, of the Julian Calendar, and January 30, of the Gregorian Calendar. This day falls in the Coptic Season of Shemu, the season of the Harvest.

Commemorations

Saints 

 The departure of Saint Anthony the Great, Father of All Monks

References 

Days of the Coptic calendar